Sven Mikser (born 8 November 1973) is an Estonian politician.

Career
As a member of the Estonian Centre Party from 2002 to 2003, Mikser served as the minister of defence in the Siim Kallas' cabinet.

Mikser was the leader of the Social Democratic Party between 16 October 2010 and 30 May 2015. He has been the Minister of Defence since 26 March 2014 in Taavi Rõivas' first and second cabinets. On 23 November 2016 he assumed the position of Minister of Foreign Affairs in the cabinet of Jüri Ratas.

Mikser was elected as a Member of the European Parliament in 2019. He has since been serving on the Committee on Foreign Affairs and its Subcommittee on Security and Defence. In addition to his committee assignments, he is part of the Parliament's delegation to the Euronest Parliamentary Assembly and to the NATO Parliamentary Assembly.

See also

List of foreign ministers in 2017
List of current foreign ministers

References

External links

Official website
Sven Mikser at the Estonian Parliament site riigikogu.ee

|-

|-

|-

1973 births
Defence Ministers of Estonia
Living people
Members of the Riigikogu, 1999–2003
Members of the Riigikogu, 2003–2007
Members of the Riigikogu, 2007–2011
Members of the Riigikogu, 2011–2015
Members of the Riigikogu, 2015–2019
Ministers of Foreign Affairs of Estonia
Leaders of political parties in Estonia
Politicians from Tartu
Social Democratic Party (Estonia) politicians
University of Tartu alumni
21st-century Estonian politicians
MEPs for Estonia 2019–2024
Social Democratic Party (Estonia) MEPs